The Supreme Court of Justice of Guatemala (La Corte Suprema de Justicia), or CSJ, is the highest court within Guatemala's judiciary branch. The Supreme Court, which is composed of thirteen justices, including a presiding President (currently Silvia Valdés), is headquartered in the Palace of Justice in Guatemala City.

References

 
Guatemala
Law of Guatemala
1851 establishments in Guatemala
Courts and tribunals established in 1851